Christine Stückelberger (born 22 May 1947) is a Swiss retired equestrian who won an individual gold medal in dressage at the 1976 Summer Olympics. She was the first, and along with ski jumper Simon Ammann, only Swiss sportsperson to compete at six Olympics: 1972, 1976, 1984, 1988, 1996, and 2000.

See also
 List of athletes with the most appearances at Olympic Games

References

External links

1947 births
Living people
Swiss female equestrians
Swiss dressage riders
Olympic equestrians of Switzerland
Equestrians at the 1972 Summer Olympics
Equestrians at the 1976 Summer Olympics
Equestrians at the 1984 Summer Olympics
Equestrians at the 1988 Summer Olympics
Equestrians at the 1996 Summer Olympics
Equestrians at the 2000 Summer Olympics
Olympic gold medalists for Switzerland
Olympic silver medalists for Switzerland
Olympic bronze medalists for Switzerland
Olympic medalists in equestrian
Sportspeople from Bern
Medalists at the 1988 Summer Olympics
Medalists at the 1984 Summer Olympics
Medalists at the 1976 Summer Olympics
20th-century Swiss women